Black Aria is an instrumental album composed by Glenn Danzig, the vocalist/songwriter for Danzig and previously of Samhain and the Misfits. It was released in 1992, and is Danzig's first album as a solo artist. The album debuted at number 1 on the American Billboard classical chart. The original release was on Glenn Danzig's own label, Plan 9 Records, and like his Misfits and Samhain releases, was distributed by Caroline Records. The album was reissued in 2000 on E-Magine Records, and a sequel followed on Evilive Records in 2006.

Music and recording
The album is largely modern instrumental classical music, and is very dark, with gothic metal tendencies.

Although it was not released until 1992, some of the material on the album was recorded as early as 1987. Select tracks from the album had served as intro music to early Danzig shows, and excerpts of some songs were included on Danzig's first two compilation home videos released by Def American Recordings in 1989 and 1991.

The first six song titles reference a soundtrack to John Milton's epic poem Paradise Lost, which describes Lucifer's rebellion from the Christian God, and his subsequent expulsion from Heaven with the angels who joined him. The final three tracks, written by Danzig while he was still in Samhain, reference Celtic mythology. "The Morrigu" relates to The Morrígan, a mythical phantom queen. "Cwn Annwn" refers to the spectral hounds of the same name.

All tracks were written by Glenn Danzig, who also performed all instruments. Engineering was provided by Nick Didia, Martin Schmelze, and Bob Alecca. Female voices were provided by Janna Brown and Reneé Rubach.

Artwork and packaging
The photograph of Glenn Danzig in the liner notes was taken by Anton Corbijn. The album's front cover is by renowned comic book and graphic artist Michael William Kaluta, who also drew the interior illustrations for Danzig's fourth album.

As the musical content of Black Aria is a diversion from the music of the band Danzig, the album has a written disclaimer to warn buyers that it is not a rock record.

Track listing
"Overture of the Rebel Angels" – 2:42
"Conspiracy Dirge" – 1:59
"Battle for Heaven" – 3:54
"Retreat and Descent" – 3:53
"Dirge of Defeat" – 1:48
"And the Angels Weep" – 1:18
"Shifter" – 1:33
"The Morrigu" – 4:25
"Cwn Anwnn" – 2:13

All songs written by Glenn Danzig.

Credits
 Glenn Danzig – all instruments
 Janna Brown – female vocals
 Reneé Rubach – female vocals

Production
 Nick Didia – engineering (tracks 1–7)
 Martin Schmelze – engineering (tracks 1–7)
 Bob Alecca – engineering (tracks 8–9)

References

External links
 

1992 debut albums
Albums produced by Glenn Danzig
Instrumental albums
Plan 9 Records albums